Torsten Wohlert (born 10 December 1965 in Travemünde) is a German former professional footballer who played as a defender.

Honours
MSV Duisburg
 DFB-Pokal finalist: 1998

References

1965 births
Living people
German footballers
Association football defenders
Bundesliga players
2. Bundesliga players
VfB Lübeck players
Borussia Dortmund players
FC 08 Homburg players
SV Waldhof Mannheim players
MSV Duisburg players
SV 19 Straelen players
West German footballers
Sportspeople from Lübeck
Footballers from Schleswig-Holstein